Philip John Belfiori (March 24, 1918 – July 3, 1957) was an American football and basketball player and coach. He served as the head football coach and head basketball coach at River Falls State Teachers College—now known as the University of Wisconsin–River Falls—from 1952 to 1956. Belfiori played college football at the University of Minnesota. Prior to his stint at Wisconsin–River Falls, was the head football coach at Stillwater Area High School in Stillwater, Minnesota, from 1940 to 1944.

Head coaching record

College football

References

External links
 

1918 births
1957 deaths
Minnesota Golden Gophers football players
Wisconsin–River Falls Falcons football coaches
Wisconsin–River Falls Falcons men's basketball coaches
High school football coaches in Minnesota
People from St. Louis County, Minnesota
Coaches of American football from Minnesota
Players of American football from Minnesota
Basketball coaches from Minnesota